The Japanese and Korean term  or Chinese , meaning "not have; without", is a key word in Buddhism, especially Zen traditions.

Etymology
The Old Chinese * is cognate with the Proto-Tibeto-Burman *ma, meaning "not". This reconstructed root is widely represented in Tibeto-Burman languages; for instance,  means "not" in both Written Tibetan and Written Burmese.

Pronunciations

The common Chinese word  was adopted in the Sino-Japanese, Sino-Korean, and Sino-Vietnamese vocabularies. The Korean   is read  (in Revised, McCune–Reischauer, and Yale romanization systems).

Meanings
"no", "not", "nothing", or "without"
"nothing", "not", "nothingness", "un-", "is not", "has not", "not any"
 Pure awareness, prior to experience or knowledge. This meaning is used especially by the Chan school of Buddhism. 
 A negative.
 Caused to be nonexistent.
 Impossible; lacking reason or cause.
 Nonexistence; nonbeing; not having; a lack of, without.
 The "original nonbeing" from which being is produced in the Tao Te Ching.

In modern Chinese, Japanese and Korean it is commonly used in combination words as a negative prefix to indicate the absence of something (no ..., without ..., un- prefix), e.g., // for "wireless". In Classical Chinese, it is an impersonal existential verb meaning "not have".

The same character is also used in Classical Chinese as a prohibitive particle, though in this case it is more properly written .

Characters
In traditional Chinese character classification, the uncommon class of phonetic loan characters involved borrowing the character for one word to write another near-homophone.

The earliest graphs for  pictured a person with outstretched arms holding something (possibly sleeves, tassels, ornaments) and represented the word  "dance; dancer".

Mu-kōan
The Gateless Gate, a 13th-century collection of Chan or Zen kōan,  uses the word wu or mu in its title (Wumenguan or Mumonkan 無門關) and first kōan case ("Zhao Zhou's Dog" 趙州狗子). Chinese Chan calls the word mu 無 "the gate to enlightenment". The Japanese Rinzai school classifies the Mu Kōan as hosshin 発心 "resolve to attain enlightenment", that is, appropriate for beginners seeking kenshō "to see the Buddha-nature"'.

Case 1 of The Gateless Gate reads as follows:

{| class=wikitable style="width:70%;"
|-
! Chinese !! English translation
|-
| 趙州和尚、因僧問、狗子還有佛性也無。州云、無。
| A monk asked Zhaozhou Congshen, a Chinese Zen master (known as Jōshū in Japanese), "Has a dog Buddha-nature or not?" Zhaozhou answered, "Wú" (in Japanese, Mu)|}

The koan originally comes from the Zhaozhou Zhenji Chanshi Yulu, The Recorded Sayings of Zen Master Zhao Zhou, koan 132:

The Book of Serenity , also known as the Book of Equanimity or more formally the Hóngzhì Chánshī Guǎnglù , has a longer version of this koan, which adds the following to the start of the version given in the Zhaozhou Zhenji Chanshi Yulu.

Origins
In the original text, the question is used as a conventional beginning to a question-and-answer exchange (mondo). The reference is to the Mahāyāna Mahāparinirvāṇa Sūtra which says for example:

Koan 363 in the Zhaozhou Zhenji Chanshi Yulu shares the same beginning question.

Interpretations
This koan is one of several traditionally used by Rinzai school to initiate students into Zen study, and interpretations of it vary widely. Hakuun Yasutani of the Sanbo Kyodan maintained that

This koan is discussed in Part 1 of Hau Hoo's The Sound of the One Hand: 281 Zen Koans with Answers. In it, the answer of "negative", mu, is clarified as although all beings have potential Buddha-nature, beings who do not have the capacity to see it and develop it essentially do not have it. The purpose of this primary koan to a student is to free the mind from analytic thinking and into intuitive knowing. A student who understands the nature of his question would understand the importance of awareness of potential to begin developing it.

Yoshitaka and Heine
The Japanese scholar  made the following comment on the two versions of the koan:

A similar critique has been given by Steven Heine:

Non-dualistic meaning

In Robert M. Pirsig's 1974 novel Zen and the Art of Motorcycle Maintenance, mu is translated as "no thing", saying that it meant "unask the question". He offered the example of a computer circuit using the binary numeral system, in effect using mu to represent high impedance:
{{quote|For example, it's stated over and over again that computer circuits exhibit only two states, a voltage for "one" and a voltage for "zero." That's silly! Any computer-electronics technician knows otherwise. Try to find a voltage representing one or zero when the power is off! The circuits are in a mu state.}}

The word features prominently with a similar meaning in Douglas Hofstadter's 1979 book, Gödel, Escher, Bach. It is used fancifully in discussions of symbolic logic, particularly Gödel's incompleteness theorems, to indicate a question whose "answer" is to either un-ask the question, indicate the question is fundamentally flawed, or reject the premise that a dualistic answer can be given.

"Mu" may be used similarly to "N/A" or "not applicable," a term often used to indicate the question cannot be answered because the conditions of the question do not match the reality. A layperson's example of this concept is often invoked by the loaded question "Have you stopped beating your wife?", to which "mu" would be the only respectable response.

The programming language Raku uses "Mu" for the root of its type hierarchy.

See also
Wuji (philosophy) 
Wu (awareness) - Chinese concept of enlightenment
Ma (negative space)
Mushin (mental state) - Japanese concept of "no mind"
Many-valued logic
Not even wrong
Nothing
Wronger than wrong
Falsum - Nature of an unsatisfiable logical proposition, neither true nor false
Wu wei, a term in Chinese philosophy
Null (disambiguation)

References

Sources

External links

Four myths about Zen Buddhism's "Mu Koan", Steven Heine
The Koan Mu, John Tarrant

Zen
Kōan
Chinese words and phrases
Japanese words and phrases
Korean words and phrases
Discordianism